Svoronos is a village and a community of the Katerini municipality. Before the 2011 local government reform it was part of the municipality of Katerini, of which it was a municipal district. The 2011 census recorded 1,948 residents in the village and 2,175 in the community.

Administrative division
The adjacent to Svoronos settlements of Agia Varvara (69 residents as of 2011) and Prosilio (158 residents as of 2011) are part of the community of Svoronos.

Notable natives
Kyriakos Papadopoulos

See also
List of settlements in the Pieria regional unit

References

Populated places in Pieria (regional unit)